Bala Lake Halt railway station in Gwynedd, Wales, was formerly a station on the Ruabon to Barmouth line.

Bala (Penybont) is the current terminus of the Bala Lake Railway, and has occupied the site of the former halt since 1976. The narrow-gauge Bala Lake Railway originally named the station Bala (Llyn Tegid) (Llyn Tegid is Welsh for "Lake Bala". The station was subsequently renamed to the current Bala (Penybont).

History
The first station for Bala opened on the site in 1868 but closed in 1882 when the Bala (New) station opened nearer the town.
Opened by the Great Western Railway in 1934, it closed in 1939. In 1976 the Bala Lake Railway opened its eastern terminus on the site. The Bala Lake Railway began passenger services in 1972, and opened extensions in 1973 and 1975. Bala was reached in 1976. Writing in the railway directory "Steam '81" the general manager, G H Barnes, stated: "We aim to be in Bala near Loch Cafe in 1981, distance then 5.25 miles." This was an official prediction of the further extension of the line into Bala town centre, but the work was not carried out, and the statement was not repeated in the following year's directory, "Steam '82", leaving Bala (Llyn Tegid) as the eastern terminus of the line.

References

Notes

Sources

Further reading

External links
 Bala (Llyn Tegid) station on navigable 1946 O. S. map Site is on railway at corner of lake labelled Pont Mwngyll-y-llyn
 Railscot on Bala and Festiniog Line
 Bala Lake Railway on the site now
 Bala Lake Halt.

Disused railway stations in Gwynedd
Railway stations in Great Britain opened in 1934
Railway stations in Great Britain opened in 1976
Railway stations in Great Britain closed in 1939
Former Great Western Railway stations
Llangywer
1934 establishments in Wales